"Fantastic Time" is a single by Hey! Say! JUMP. It was released on October 26, 2016.

The title song is used as the opening theme for NTV's anime Time Bokan 24, which started on October 1, 2016. It's a song that conveys the message: "Vigorously move forward while being excited about the 'present' that connects the past and the future."

The single was available for purchase in three different types: Regular Edition, Regular Edition First Press, and Limited Edition. The Limited Edition DVD contains a PV, making-of footage, and choreography video. As for the Regular Edition First Press, it included a photo book featuring pictures that the members took of each other. Finally, the Regular Edition comes with three coupling songs and their karaoke versions.

Regular Edition
CD
 "Fantastic Time"
 "Never Let You Go"
 "Wonder Road"
 "What A Feeling"
 "Fantastic Time" (Original Karaoke)
 "Never Let You Go" (Original Karaoke)
 "Wonder Road" (Original Karaoke)
 "What A Feeling" (Original Karaoke)

Regular Edition First Press
CD
 "Fantastic Time"
 "Never Let You Go"
 "Seijaku no Asa, Kimi to Iru Sekai。"
 "Seijaku no Asa, Kimi to Iru Sekai。" (Original Karaoke)
FANtastic Photo Book

Limited Edition
CD
 "Fantastic Time"

DVD
 "Fantastic Time" (PV & Making of)
 Practice Time (Member Choreography Video)

References

2016 singles
Hey! Say! JUMP songs
2016 songs
J Storm singles